"Finger on the Trigger" is a song by Australian hard rock band The Angels. Released as a non-album single in November 1988, it peaked at number 34 on the ARIA Charts.

Track listing
7-inch single (Mushroom K640)
 "Finger on the Trigger" (Bob Spencer) – 3:46
 "Straight Aces" (Doc Neeson, Rick Brewster, Jim Hilbun, Brent Eccles) – 3:56
12-inch single
 "Finger on the Trigger (Spencer) – 3:46
 "Straight Aces" (Neeson, Brewster, Hilbun, Eccles) – 3:56
 "Living in the Bodyguard of Luxury" - 3:56

Personnel
 Rick Brewster – lead and rhythm guitars, vocals
 Doc Neeson – lead vocals
 Brent Eccles – drums
 Jim Hilbun – bass, vocals, saxophone, keyboards
 Bob Spencer – lead guitar, rhythm guitar, vocals

Charts

References

The Angels (Australian band) songs
Mushroom Records singles
1988 songs
1988 singles